Fantegutten (The Gypsy) is a Norwegian film from 1932 directed by Leif Sinding. Sinding also wrote the screenplay, which was based on Harald Meltzer's novel of the same name, published posthumously in 1873. Egil Sætren designed the sets.

Plot
The film opens in a valley on a spring day. A couple is buried in an avalanche, but their son Iver miraculously succeeds in escaping. He is found by the wealthy farmer Sjur Rognved, who lets the boy stay with him. Growing up, Ivar falls in love with the farmer's daughter Ragnhild, who returns his love. One day a group of Gypsies comes to the farm, and a woman in the group, Marja, recognizes Iver as her nephew. When the farmer learns this, he no longer wants Ragnhild to marry Iver because he does not consider "Gypsy blood" pure. Iver is furious about this and takes refuge with the travelers. However, Iver finds their wandering life too uncertain and he grows tired of it. When he hears that Ragnhild will marry Bottolf, he leaves the travelers and returns home. He succeeds in stopping the wedding at the last moment, and finally the wealthy farmer also gives his approval for the marriage between Iver and Ragnhild.

There is another version of the film with an alternative ending, in which Iver interrupts Sjur and Ragnhild before they arrive at the church. Then one sees Ragnhild and Iver in the church singing a hymn along with an open Bible between them.

Music
"Fanteguttens lengsel" (The Gypsy Boy's Longing; composed by Reidar Thommessen)
"Foni mi gitara" (composed by Reidar Thommessen)
"Elsk mig, zigeuner" (Love Me, Gypsy; composed by Jacques Armand, a.k.a. Olof Thiel)

Cast
Odd Frogg as Iver, the Gypsy boy
Egil Eide as Sjur Sjursen Rognved, a wealthy farmer
Helga Rydland as Aase, Sjur's wife
Randi Brænne as Ragnhild, Sjur and Aase's daughter
Amund Rydland as Mons Bottolfsen
Finn Bernhoft as Bottolf, his son
Oscar Larsen as the priest
Reidar Kaas as Parkas, a Gypsy chief
Ellen Sinding as Tatjana, a dancer
Marie Hedemark as Marja, a fortuneteller
Eugen Skjønberg as Christian, Marja's husband
Mimi Kihle	as Ilona, Christian and Marja's daughter
Per Kvist as Elias, a Gypsy
Alfred Maurstad as Stephan, a Gypsy
Arthur Barking as Boris, a Gypsy
Egil Sætren as a vagabond, Iver's father
Alfhild Grimsgaard as the vagabond's wife, Iver's mother

References

External links
 
 Fantegutten at the National Library of Norway
 Fantegutten at the Swedish Film Database

1932 films
Norwegian black-and-white films
Norwegian drama films
1930s Norwegian-language films
1932 drama films